William Warner (June 11, 1840 – October 4, 1916) was an American lawyer and politician based in Kansas City, Missouri. He became mayor of Kansas City in 1871, serving a one year term. He later represented Missouri in both the U.S. House of Representatives and the U.S. Senate.

Early life
Warner was born in Shullsburg, in Lafayette County, Wisconsin. His parents died in his youth, and he was raised by his sister, Mary Ann Warner Webb and her husband, Daniel Webb III. He studied law at Lawrence University and the University of Michigan at Ann Arbor and admitted to the bar in 1861. He enlisted in 1862 as a 1st Lieutenant in the 33rd Wisconsin Volunteer Infantry Regiment and was mustered out at the close of the Civil War in Madison, Wisconsin with the rank of major. He married Sophia Frances Bullen on August 7, 1866. They had six children.

Political career
Warner then moved his practice to Kansas City, where he served as city attorney in 1867, circuit attorney in 1868, and as the mayor of Kansas City, Missouri in 1871. He was elected as a Republican to the 49th and 50th Congresses, serving from March 4, 1885 to March 4, 1889, but he was not a candidate for renomination in 1888.

Warner was elected commander in chief of the Grand Army of the Republic in 1888 for a one-year term.  He was also a member of the Wisconsin Commandery of the Military Order of the Loyal Legion of the United States.

Warner unsuccessfully ran as the Republican candidate for Missouri Governor in 1892, but served as the United States district attorney for the western district of Missouri in 1882-1884, 1898, and 1902–1905. In 1882, he was one of the original incorporators of the Kansas City Club.

In 1905, Warner was elected as a Republican to the United States Senate, serving from March 18, 1905 to March 4, 1911 in the 60th and 61st Congresses, where he was chairman of the Senate Committee on Mississippi River and Its Tributaries, and served on the Inland Waterways Commission. He was not a candidate for reelection.

Later life
Warner resumed the practice of law and was appointed as a civilian member of the Board of Ordnance and Fortifications and a member of the Board of Managers of the National Home for Disabled Volunteer Soldiers. His widow, Sophia, received a pension until her death in 1923.

Notes

External links

Bio & Photo, National Magazine, October 1905

1840 births
1916 deaths
People of Wisconsin in the American Civil War
Mayors of Kansas City, Missouri
People from Shullsburg, Wisconsin
Burials at Elmwood Cemetery (Kansas City, Missouri)
Lawrence University alumni
Republican Party United States senators from Missouri
University of Michigan Law School alumni
Republican Party members of the United States House of Representatives from Missouri
Grand Army of the Republic Commanders-in-Chief
19th-century American politicians